The year 2014 was the sixth year in the history of BRACE, a mixed martial arts promotion based in Australia. In 2014 BRACE held 8 events.

Events list

BRACE Tournament Season 1 Final 

BRACE Tournament Season 1 Final was an event held on November 20, 2014, at AIS Arena
in Canberra, Australia.

Results

BRACE Ascend 2

BRACE Ascend 2 was an event held on November 15, 2014, at North Sydney Leagues Club
in Sydney, Australia.

Results

BRACE 30

BRACE 30 was an event held on September 20, 2014, at AIS Arena in Sydney, Australia.

Results

BRACE 29

BRACE 29 was an event held on August 9, 2014, at North Sydney Leagues Club
in Sydney, Australia.

Results

BRACE 28

BRACE 28 was an event held on August 8, 2014, at North Sydney Leagues Club
in Sydney, Australia.

Results

BRACE 27

BRACE 27 was an event held on May 17, 2014, at AIS Arena, in Canberra , Australia.

Results

BRACE Ascend 1

BRACE Ascend 1 was an event held on May3, 2014, at North Sydney Leagues Club
in Sydney, Australia.

Results

BRACE 26

BRACE 26 was an event held on March 15, 2014, at North Sydney Leagues Club in Sydney, Australia.

Results

References 

2014 in mixed martial arts
2014 in Australian sport
BRACE (mixed martial arts) events